Bartter syndrome, infantile, with sensorineural deafness (Barttin), also known as BSND, is a human gene which is associated with Bartter syndrome.

This gene encodes an essential beta subunit for CLC chloride channels. These heteromeric channels localize to basolateral membranes of renal tubules and of potassium-secreting epithelia of the inner ear. Mutations in this gene have been associated with Bartter syndrome with sensorineural deafness.

References

External links

Further reading